The 138th Guards Separate Motor Rifle Brigade (138th MRB) is a formation of the Russian Ground Forces. It is stationed in the Western Military District, in the village of Kamenka, Vyborgsky District, Leningrad Oblast. It is Military unit No. 02511. It includes various components: air defense, artillery battalion, infantry and tank battalions.

45th Guards Rifle Division 
The brigade traces its history to the 45th Guards Rifle Division of the Second World War. The 45th Guards Rifle Division was formed from the 70th Rifle Division, and fought near Leningrad, in Estonia and Kurland. The division was with the 6th Guards Army of the Kurland Group, Leningrad Front in May 1945. On 25 June 1957 the 45th Guards Rifle Division became the 45th Guards Motor Rifle Division. In December 1997 the 45th Guards Krasnosel'skaya, Order of Lenin Red Banner Motor Rifle Division named for A.A. Zhdanov became the 138th Guards Motor Rifle Brigade.

138th Guards Motor Rifle Brigade 

In 1994-1995 a force from the 129th Guards Motor Rifle Regiment with 45 T-80 tanks was deployed to Groznyy.

The brigade was deployed for operations during the Second Chechen War, in which, along with other Russian Ground Forces units, its personnel was reported to have behaved badly at times. A 22-year-old woman in Ingushetia was shot by drunken soldiers from the brigade scavenging for alcohol. The deployment of a tank battalion of the brigade was apparently halted when it was discovered that soldiers had been selling the explosive from their tanks' reactive armour.

In March 2010 Leningrad Military District commander General Lieutenant Nikolai Bogdanovskiy said, regarding problems with the command and violence in the 138th at Kamenka:
“. . . we haven’t managed to complete fully tasks connected with discipline–in particular, in the 138th Kamenka Brigade the commander, chief of staff, and assistants for armaments and socialization work were dismissed because of events there.  Now the situation is normalising, we are trying not to repeat past mistakes.”

The 45th Guards Motor Rifle Division was a separate formation from the 45th Rifle Division (Soviet Union) - not a Guards unit - that was the predecessor to the district's  200th Motor Rifle Brigade, based at Pechenga in Murmansk Oblast.

According to the Finnish newspaper Helsingin Sanomat article, two battle groups of approximately 800 men each from the brigade had been sent to participate in the 2022 Russian invasion of Ukraine. According to Helsingin Sanomat, social media sources claim the brigade fighting in Battle of Kharkiv. Local inhabitants of Kamenka interviewed by Helsingin Sanomat claim the brigade has suffered losses and hundreds of soldiers were wounded; however, the paper was unable to verify the claims. On 20 March 2022, Ukraine claimed that 10 servicemen in the 138th were being investigated for refusing to fight and encouraging others in the unit to return home.  Elements of the brigade were routed in the Battle of Kharkiv and were withdrawn into Russia.

Commanders  
 Major-General Mikhail Malofeyev (21.11.1997 – 15.7.1999)
 Major General Igor Turchanyuk (05.8.1999 – 07.7.2000)
 Colonel Bagir Yusuf oglu Fatulayev (temporarily filled the post of 08.07.2000 – 21.09.2000)
 Major General Anatoli Elkin (22.9.2000 – 22.02.2002)
 Major General Andrey Serdyukov (temporarily filled the post in 10.03.2002, has been appointed 11.7.2002 – 09.6.2004)
 Major-General Vladimir Genrikhovich Tsilko (22.6.2004 – 14.6.2005)
 Colonel  Alexander Romanenko (14.6.2005 – 24.4.2008)
 Colonel Vladimir Frolov (temporarily filled the post of 25.4.2008 – 19.6.2008)
 Colonel Alibek Navruzbekovich Aslanbek (20.6.2008  – 10.2009 ) 
 ...
 Colonel (Guards) Sergei Maksimov (since 2021)

Notes

External links 
http://russiandefpolicy.wordpress.com/2009/12/10/ - hazing incidents in 2009
https://russiandefpolicy.blog/2019/11/13/krasnoselskaya-brigade/ - sketch profile, 2019

Mechanised infantry brigades of Russia
Military units and formations of the 2022 Russian invasion of Ukraine